Reginald Leslie Keates (born 27 June 1980) is a former South African born English cricketer. Keates was a right-handed batsman who bowled right-arm off break.

In 2002, Keates made his debut for Dorset in the Minor Counties Championship against Oxfordshire. From 2002 to 2005, he represented the county in 8 Minor Counties Championship matches, with his final match for the county coming against Herefordshire in 2005.

In 2002, Keates also made his List-A debut for Dorset against the Worcestershire Cricket Board in the 1st round of the 2003 Cheltenham & Gloucester Trophy, which was played in 2002. Keates represented the county in a further 2 List-A matches against Buckinghamshire in the 1st round of the 2004 Cheltenham & Gloucester Trophy which was played in 2003 and against Yorkshire in the 2nd round of the 2004 Cheltenham & Gloucester Trophy which was played in 2004.

External links
Reginald Keates at Cricinfo

1980 births
Living people
Cricketers from Johannesburg
English sportspeople of South African descent
English cricketers
Dorset cricketers
English cricketers of the 21st century